Serniki  is a village in Lubartów County, Lublin Voivodeship, in eastern Poland. It is the seat of the gmina (administrative district) called Gmina Serniki.

References

Villages in Lubartów County
Lublin Governorate